Jillian Laura Weymouth Smythe (born 19 December 1985) is an Irish former cricketer who played as a right-arm medium bowler. She appeared in seven One Day Internationals for Ireland in 2005 and 2006, including playing at the 2005 World Cup.

References

External links
 
 

1985 births
Living people
Cricketers from Dublin (city)
Irish women cricketers
Ireland women One Day International cricketers